In mathematics, the matrix

 

is sometimes called the quincunx matrix. It is a 2×2 Hadamard matrix, and its rows form the basis of a diagonal square lattice consisting of the integer points whose coordinates both have the same parity; this lattice is a two-dimensional analogue of the three-dimensional body-centered cubic lattice.

See also
Quincunx

Notes

Matrices